Diana King (2 August 1918 – 31 July 1986) was an English actress who had a career on British television from 1939 to 1986. Born in Buckinghamshire, she was sometimes credited as Diane King.

Television roles
King's first television appearance was as a pupil of Tadworth House School in Little Ladyship in 1939. She continued to appear on television and in films throughout the 1940s and 1950s. In 1961, she appeared in The Avengers.

From the 1960s to the early 1980s, she appeared in The Benny Hill Show, Crossroads, Dixon of Dock Green, Pride and Prejudice, You're Only Young Twice and Z-Cars.

King was perhaps best known for her many appearances in situation comedies from the 1960s onwards. She had roles in Dad's Army, Father, Dear Father, The Liver Birds, Fawlty Towers (in the episode "The Wedding Party"), George and Mildred, Bless This House, Rising Damp, Come Back Mrs Noah and Some Mothers Do 'Ave 'Em. She also had semi-regular roles in Are You Being Served? as Mrs Peacock, in Terry and June replacing the late Joan Benham in the role of Melinda Spry, as Norah in Bachelor Father and as George's mother in Marriage Lines. She appeared in Follow Me from 1978 to 1981, with Francis Matthews as moderator.

Her final television appearance was in Inside Story, which was shown in 1986, the year she died of cancer in Nettlebed, Oxfordshire, two days before her 68th birthday.

Partial filmography

References

External links
 
 

1918 births
1986 deaths
English film actresses
English television actresses
Actresses from Buckinghamshire
Deaths from cancer in England
20th-century English actresses